Ulmanis (feminine: Ulmane) is a Latvian surname of German origin (from German surname Ullmann). Individuals with the surname include:

Guntis Ulmanis (born 1939), President of Latvia 1993–1999
Gunārs Ulmanis (1938–2010), Latvian footballer
Kārlis Ulmanis (1877–1942), First Prime Minister of Latvia

See also 
Ullmann
Ulmann
Ullman
Ulman

Latvian-language masculine surnames
Surnames of German origin